Thiepval a commune in the Somme department, Hauts-de-France, France.

Thiepval may also refer to:

Thiepval Barracks, headquarters of the British Army in Northern Ireland
HMCS Thiepval, a 1917 sunken Canadian trawler